Jamba Airport  is an airport serving Jamba, in Huíla Province, Angola.

See also

 List of airports in Angola
 Transport in Angola

References

External links
Jamba Airport
OpenStreetMap - Jamba
OurAirports - Jamba 
Bing Maps - Jamba

Airports in Angola